Cheshmeh-ye Sangi-ye Rutvand (also Romanized as Cheshmeh-ye Sangī-ye Rūtvand; also known as Cheshmeh Sangīn and Rūtvand-e Ardeshīr) is a village in Cheleh Rural District, in the Central District of Gilan-e Gharb County, Kermanshah Province, Iran. At the 2006 census, its population was 114, in 25 families.

References 

Populated places in Gilan-e Gharb County